The laouto (pl. laouta ) is a long-neck fretted instrument of the lute family, found in Greece and Cyprus, and similar in appearance to the oud. It has four double-strings. It is played in most respects like the oud (plucked with a long plectrum); in Cyprus the laouto is plucked with a feather. This instrument is known in Albania as "llautë" (indefinite form) or "llauta" (definite form), and in Romania as "lăuta".

Construction
Unlike the oud and other short-necked lutes, the laouto has a higher string tension due to its steel strings and longer neck, and hence it is brighter in tone than the oud. It also has movable frets to permit the playing of the dromoi, or modes of Greek traditional music. The laouto also tends to have only one sound hole (sometimes two) whereas the oud family tend to have three. Despite this, there are many similarities between the laouto and the oud.

The soundboard is often made of spruce or cedar wood, while the body is usually made of a harder wood such as maple or walnut. This is a practice consonant with the construction of other (round-backed) lutes.

The 11 frets of the neck are removable (and can be re-positioned for differing intervals) and made of nylon (resembling the gut/nylon frets of the lute). Up to 9 wooden frets, mounted on the soundboard, are fixed. The intervals of the frets may be more frequent than that of a guitar to permit the playing of maqams.

The strings of the laouto were traditionally of gut, although modern laoutos have also steel (or steel wound nylon) strings similar to those of the bouzouki.

Tuning

Except for the first (A4A4) strings, which are tuned in unison, the laouto's other strings are paired, tuned an octave apart. The interval from one pair to the next is tuned in fifths (C3C4-G3G4-D3D4-A4A4). The Laouto has a re-entrant tuning, G3G4 tuned a fourth lower than C3C4.

The two primary contemporary variants of the laouto, one somewhat smaller than the other, are to be found on mainland Greece (steriano laouto) and on the island of Crete (Cretan laouto). The larger sized instrument (wider body) is played mainly on the island of Crete and tends to be tuned differently (G2G3 - D2D3 - A2A3 - E3E3), the re-entrant tuning is still a characteristic of the Cretan laouto (or lagouto), because D2D3 is a fourth lower than G2G3. In Cyprus, Cypriot laouto is tuned C - G - D - A.

The role of the laouto in Greek traditional music is primarily that of accompaniment. The laouto is often played in a duo (the one laouto tuned more bass than the other) with the Cretan lyra or with the violin (in Cyprus).

Notable players
Giannis Haroulis
Evagoras Karageorgis
Vasilis Kostas
Thanasis Papakonstantinou
Yiannis Xylouris, also known as Psaroyiannis
Giorgos Xylouris
Christos Zotos
Thor Algren

See also
 Lavta (Politiko laouto)

References

Literature

External links

 Cretan music
  Atlas of plucked musical instruments
 Solo Cretan laouto video

Composite chordophones
Early musical instruments
Greek musical instruments
Necked bowl lutes
Greek inventions